= Resonance Room =

Italian metal band

Resonance Room was an Italian gothic progressive/doom metal band. They released two albums.

== Discography ==
- Unspoken (2008)
- Untouchable Failure (2013)
